In Greek mythology, Paeon or Paion (Ancient Greek: Παίων, gen.: Παίονος) was the son of Antilochus, and a lord of Messenia. Antilochus was one of the suitors of Helen, who together with his father Nestor, the king of Pylos, and brother Thrasymedes, fought in the Trojan War. According to the second-century geographer Pausanias, Paeon's sons were among the descendants of Neleus (the Neleidae) expelled from Messenia, by the descendants of Heracles, as part of the legendary  "Return of the Heracleidae", later associated with the supposed "Dorian invasion". According to Pausanias, the sons of Paeon, along with other of the expelled Neleidae, Alcmaeon and Melanthus fled to Athens, and it was from this Paeon that the Attic clan  and deme of Paeonidae or Paionidai were supposed to have derived its name. The deme was apparently the same as the Paeonia, which Herodotus located as being below the Attic fortress of Leipsydrium.

Notes

References
 Grimal, Pierre, The Dictionary of Classical Mythology, Wiley-Blackwell, 1996,  .
 Herodotus; Histories, A. D. Godley (translator), Cambridge, Massachusetts: Harvard University Press, 1920; . Online version at the Perseus Digital Library.
 Larcher, Pierre-Henri, Larcher's notes on Herodotus: Historical and critical comments on the history of Herodotus, with a chronological table, Volume 2, Whittaker, 1844.
 Leeuwen, Jan, "Homerica", in "Mnemosyne, Volume 35", E. J. Brill., 1907. p. 53
 Pausanias, Description of Greece. W. H. S. Jones (translator). Loeb Classical Library. Cambridge, MA: Harvard University Press; London, William Heinemann Ltd. (1918). Vol. 1. Books I–II: .
 Tripp, Edward, Crowell's Handbook of Classical Mythology, Thomas Y. Crowell Co; First edition (June 1970). .
 Smith, William (1854), Dictionary of Greek and Roman Geography, London. Online version at the Perseus Digital Library
 Smith, William (1873), Dictionary of Greek and Roman Biography and Mythology, London. Online version at the Perseus Digital Library

Princes in Greek mythology
Pylian characters in Greek mythology